Sitta Umaru Turay (born December 24, 1978 in Freetown, Sierra Leone) is a Sierra Leonean journalist and current member of the  editorial Board of the Freetown-based Sierra Express newspaper.

External links
https://web.archive.org/web/20080503095144/http://www.sierraexpressmedia.com/id501.html
http://www.youthwaternetwork.org/ywn/profile.asp?MemberId=90

1978 births
Living people
Njala University alumni
Sierra Leonean journalists
People from Freetown